Eremophila caperata is a flowering plant in the figwort family, Scrophulariaceae and is endemic to the south-west of Western Australia. It is a broom-like shrub with flat, narrow, wrinkled leaves and white or light pink to lilac-coloured flowers.

Description
The branches are rough and often lumpy, shiny and sticky. The leaves have a wrinkled surface and there is a slight hook on the end.

The petal tube is white, light pink to lilac-coloured, spotted brown inside the tube. The inside and outside surfaces are hairy and there are 4 stamens enclosed within the petal tube.

Taxonomy and naming
Eremophila caperata was first formally described by Robert Chinnock in 2007 and the description was published in Eremophila and Allied Genera: A Monograph of the Plant Family Myoporaceae. The specific epithet (caperata) is a Latin word meaning "wrinkled".

Distribution and habitat
This eremophila occurs over a wide area between Wubin, Hyden and the Plumridge Lakes area where it grows in sand, clay or loam on dunes and depressions, often in saline soils and in Eucalyptus woodland.

Use in horticulture
The delicate leaves of E. caperata, its compact shape and masses of showy flowers in spring make this a suitable screening or understorey shrub. It can be propagated from cuttings or by grafting onto Myoporum. It grows in a wide range of soils, in full sun or partial shade and is both frost and drought tolerant.

Conservation status
Eremophila caperata is classified as "not threatened" by the Western Australian Government Department of Parks and Wildlife.

References

caperata
Eudicots of Western Australia
Plants described in 2007
Endemic flora of Western Australia